Stanhopea graveolens is a species of orchid occurring from Mexico to Honduras.

References

External links 

graveolens
Orchids of Central America
Orchids of Belize
Orchids of Mexico
Orchids of Honduras